The 1822 special election for Maine's 2nd congressional district was to select the successor for Representative Ezekiel Whitman (F), who resigned from his position on June 1, 1822. Mark Harris won the election, and took his seat on December 2, 1822.

Election results

References

See also
 List of special elections to the United States House of Representatives
 1822 and 1823 United States House of Representatives elections
 List of United States representatives from Maine

1822 02
Maine 1822 02
Maine 02
United States House of Representatives 02
United States House of Representatives 1822 02
Maine 02